is a character in Resident Evil (Biohazard in Japan), a survival horror video game series created by Japanese company Capcom. She was introduced as one of two player characters in Resident Evil 2 (1998), alongside Leon S. Kennedy. Claire is the younger sister of series hero Chris Redfield, former officer of Raccoon Police Department's S.T.A.R.S unit to fight the Umbrella Corporation, a pharmaceutical company whose bioterrorism creates zombies and other bio-organic weapons. She became a member of TerraSave, an organization that was formed after the Raccoon City incident.

Claire is the protagonist of several Resident Evil games and novelizations. She also appears in the CG animated film Degeneration (2008), and in the animated miniseries Infinite Darkness (2021). In later games, such as Code: Veronica (2000), Survivor 2 – Code: Veronica (2001), The Darkside Chronicles (2009),  The Mercenaries 3D (2011) and Operation Raccoon City (2012), her features were based on Canadian actress Alyson Court. In the live-action films, Claire has been portrayed by actress Ali Larter and Kaya Scodelario.

Claire has received mostly positive reviews from video game publications. Most of the critics listed Claire among the most popular and attractive video game characters.

Concept and design 
Claire Redfield was originally known as 'Elza Walker', the female lead in the original version of Resident Evil 2 (in 1997, after a year of work, this version of the game was scrapped by the development team and is now widely referred to as "Resident Evil 1.5"). In the released version of the game, rewritten by Noboru Sugimura, Elza Walker, a blond college student and motorcycle racer, was changed into Chris Redfield's sister named Claire. Her appearance and background remained mostly unchanged, but she was given an explanation for her skills with firearms and other weapons and her reason for coming to Raccoon City was to search for Chris, as opposed to trying to recruit fans at Raccoon City university to form a racing team back in her hometown. She was given physical features which more closely resemble her brother, her signature jacket with "Made in Heaven" printed on the back, and a sheath for a standard-issue S.T.A.R.S. knife from Chris. These changes that occurred were done to connect Resident Evil 2 to the original game. While Hideki Kamiya created Claire alongside Leon, he was aided by novelist Sugimura in order to make the writing more appealing. Sugimura often revised the Resident Evil 2 scenario such as the multiple interactions the two player characters have and what weapon should each acquire. 

Resident Evil – Code: Veronica producer Shinji Mikami said "Claire became a lot tougher than I Imagined. I thought she should look the same, but the game director made her that way because she had such an experience in Resident Evil 2, she could handle any situation now!" For Resident Evil: Revelations 2, the now hardened and aggressive Claire was redesigned to be a contrasting character to the young, immature and easily scared Moira Burton, who was defined as a purely supporting character, and they both serve different roles in the story and have different functions. The game's producer Michiteru Okabe said: "Really, only after did we look back and say, 'Oh, I guess they are both girls.' Which is good, because it means we're treating them as whole characters and not just as their gender. What we settled on is the idea that you have different roles -- it isn't two against the world, it's one against the world with a helper." Okabe also cited Claire's "great popularity with fans" and the game's writer Dai Satō being "a big fan of her personally" as factors that led to Claire's return.

During the development of Resident Evil: Degeneration, producer Hiroyuki Kobayashi stated that Leon and Claire returned as protagonists due to their relationship and role in Resident Evil 2. For the remake of the original Resident Evil 2, the "modernized" Claire has been redesigned and modeled after Canadian model Jordan McEwen. Her hair style is different and her hair is no longer brownish red; instead, she is a brunette. Her wardrobe was also redesigned, with her original hotpants and bike shorts replaced by jeans and the jacket now being long-sleeved. Although Resident Evil: Vendetta takes place after Resident Evil 6, Eiichiro Sasaki made the mini-series Resident Evil: Infinite Darkness to be set before the game events in order to have more freedom with the younger incarnations of Claire and Leon. He also noted that they were too popular and thus they wanted to be careful wiith their characterizations.

Appearances

In Resident Evil series
Claire Redfield first appears in Resident Evil 2 (1998), which revolves around her search for her missing brother Chris, an officer in the local police special force S.T.A.R.S.. Claire arrives in the Midwestern United States town of Raccoon City to find it overrun by zombies. She soon meets up with a rookie cop Leon S. Kennedy, but along the way she is separated from him. The rest of the game focuses on Claire's struggle to escape from the city alive. She maintains radio contact with Leon and teams up with a young girl named Sherry, while fighting against the various undead creatures infesting the Raccoon Police Department building, including the mutated scientist William Birkin. Claire eventually escapes from the city through the Umbrella Corporation's underground research complex along with Leon and Sherry, after the three of them manage to destroy Birkin. In the game's epilogue, Claire leaves to continue her search for Chris, while Leon and Sherry are rescued by the U.S. military.

Claire, still searching for her brother, is playable for the bulk of Resident Evil - Code: Veronica (2000), set three months after the events of Resident Evil 2. After an unsuccessful infiltration of Umbrella's medical branch in Paris, Claire finds herself imprisoned on Umbrella-owned Rockfort Island. She escapes following another viral outbreak caused by a rival corporation of Umbrella's and teams up with fellow ex-prisoner Steve Burnside. Claire manages to discover the whereabouts of her brother and send a message to Leon. Claire, Steve and the arriving Chris escape from the island, only to find themselves in another of Umbrella's secret labs, this time in Antarctica, before they are taken captive by the antagonist Alexia Ashford. The second half of the game follows Chris trying to save his captured sister from Umbrella. Chris finds his way into the Antarctic lab and rescues her before their final battle with Alexia, which costs Steve's life, and the siblings escape from the facility via the transport airplane he used to get there. During the game's ending they vow to put an end to the Umbrella Corporation. In the PlayStation 2 version, Veronica X, Claire also has a brief encounter with the series' main villain Albert Wesker that would have resulted in her death had Wesker not been called away by his associates.

In Resident Evil Survivor 2 – Code: Veronica (2001), the entire plot of which is actually just her nightmare dream after the escape from Antarctica in the original Code: Veronica; and in Resident Evil: Uprising, a mobile game version of Resident Evil 2. Claire is playable in Resident Evil: The Darkside Chronicles (2009), which retells the events of Resident Evil 2 and Resident Evil - Code: Veronica.

Claire returned as a protagonist in the episodical game Resident Evil: Revelations  2 (2015), set between the events of Resident Evil 5 and Resident Evil 6. Claire is now a member of TerraSave, a non-profit humanitarian aid and protest activism organization. The game follows her and Barry Burton's daughter Moira as they get kidnapped and find themselves trapped in a mysterious abandoned prison island. There they fight Alex Wesker and the "Afflicted" creatures. In the end both of them survive the events along with Barry, who arrived to look for them, and a little girl named Natalia Korda. She also returned as a playable character in Resident Evil 2 (2019), a remake of the 1998 game.

Claire also appears in several non-canonical games in the series. She is a further playable in the non-canonical spin-off games Resident Evil: The Mercenaries 3D (2011), and in Resident Evil: Operation Raccoon City (2012) where she is also one of the game's bosses in the game's main mode. In addition, Claire is one of two playable characters in Resident Evil: Zombie Busters, which started as a browser game in the Capcom Party line and in 2011 was converted for mobile phones. Claire, along with Leon's costume, appears in Resident Evil: Resistance (2020).

In films

Paul W. S. Anderson, who wrote the screenplays for the six films in the original Resident Evil film series (2002–2016), did not include the character of Claire Redfield in the first two films. He did not include her in the early drafts of the third film, Resident Evil: Extinction (2007), as the character of Jill Valentine was supposed to re-appear from her debut in the second film, Resident Evil: Apocalypse (2004). Later, Anderson and producer Jeremy Bolt decided to have a different game character, Claire, appear alongside series lead protagonist Alice: "We thought, rather than bring Jill back, put her with another game heroine." Actress Ali Larter portrays Claire in Resident Evil: Extinction (2007). In the film, Claire is the leader of a convoy of zombie apocalypse survivors who, at the end of the film, go to Alaska in search of a safe haven. 

The Extinction version of Claire has no connection to the video game character and her look was redesigned. When Larter reprised the role in the fourth installment, Resident Evil: Afterlife (2010), she was dressed in an outfit more resembling Claire's costumes in the games and she is red-haired. In Afterlife, Claire is ambushed by the Umbrella Corporation and manipulated by a device that controls her and impairs her memory, before she is rescued by Program Alice and reunited with her brother Chris. 

Claire did not appear in the fifth film, Resident Evil: Retribution (2012), where she is presumed dead. Larter returned to the role a third time, in the sixth and final film of the original film series, Resident Evil: The Final Chapter (2016). Claire teams up with Alice and the Red Queen to save the remnants of humanity. Her design in this film was inspired by that from the game installment Revelations 2.

The video game series' Claire plays a major role in the computer-animated film Resident Evil: Degeneration (2008), reuniting her with Leon S. Kennedy. The film is set seven years after the events of the game Resident Evil 2 and Claire has become a prominent TerraSave member. Claire has also appeared in the Netflix series Resident Evil: Infinite Darkness (2021), alongside Leon.

Claire, played by Kaya Scodelario, is a lead protagonist in the reboot film Resident Evil: Welcome to Raccoon City (2021), which does not include the Alice character of the original film series.

Other appearances 
A romantic comedy retelling of the story of Resident Evil 2, centered on Claire, Leon and Ada, was released by Chingwin Publishing in the two-issue Taiwanese comic Èlíng Gǔbǎo II in 1999. Claire is also prominently featured in S.D. Perry's 1999 novels Resident Evil: City of the Dead (a novelization of Resident Evil 2) and Resident Evil Code Veronica (a novelization of the game of the same title and the last book in the series), as well as in the 1998–1999 manhua Shēnghuà Wēijī 2 ("Biological Crisis 2"), and in the comic book adaptation series Resident Evil by Capcom (1998) and Resident Evil: Code Veronica by WildStorm (2002). In S. D. Perry's 1999 original-story novel Resident Evil: Underworld and Resident Evil: Code Veronica. She is also one of main characters in Naoki Serizawa's manga Biohazard: heavenly island, serialized in Weekly Shōnen Champion magazine in 2015, in which she is a TerraSave investigator on an isolated South American island. She also appeared in George A. Romero's Japanese TV commercial for Resident Evil 2 In 2000, a 1,800-unit special "Claire Redfield red" limited edition series of the Dreamcast game console was released in Japan. Merchandise featuring Claire include action figures, jacket, and figurines.

Outside the Resident Evil franchise, Claire appears as an unlockable bonus character in sports game Trick'N Snowboarder (1999), and in 2013 she has been added to the browser-based social game Onimusha Soul, for which she was redesigned to fit the feudal Japan theme. One of costumes for the character Crimson Viper in the fighting game Ultimate Marvel vs. Capcom 3 was inspired by Claire's iconic look in Resident Evil 2. Her costume also appears in Dead by Daylight as a legendary skin for Jill Valentine. In March 2023, Claire and Leon appeared in Fortnite Battle Royale.

Reception 
The character of Claire Redfield was very well received by critics and general public alike for her good looks and survival prowess. Readers of German magazine Mega Fun voted her as #2 "Video-Babe" of 1998. She was one of the seven nominees for the Nintendo Power Awards 1999 in the category "Best New Hero" for Resident Evil 2 (the Nintendo 64 version), placing third by popular vote, and the staff of Eurogamer nominated her for the Gaming Globes 2000 awards in the category "Female Lead Character". Claire was chosen as one of the 20 "muses" of video games by Brazilian magazine SuperGamePower in 2001. Rob Wright of Tom's Games listed Claire among the 50 greatest female characters in video game history in 2007 Her guest appearance in Trick'N Snowboarder placed fifth in GamesRadars 2010 list of best character cameos and in 2015 Entertainment Monthly placed Claire Redfield and Steve Burnside among the top ten tragic relationships in video games. In 2017, Inverses Jessica Famularo ranked her as the third best character in the series: "She's feminine and stronger for it — Claire is definitely an example of the sort of female protagonist games need." Retrospectively, Famitsu included her among the best Japanese video game characters of the 1990s.

Several publications included Claire among the most attractive video game characters. Dreamcast Magazine ranked this "gun-toting, zombie killing, foxy babe" as the fifth top "girl on the Dreamcast" in 2000, while Dreamcast Das Offizielle Magazin opined she is more beautiful than Lara Croft. Omar Ali of Gaming Target included Claire Redfield and Jill Valentine together in his 2001 list of "all time favorite leading ladies in video games" noting them for being "two girls who made the dead rise up with their looks." In 2008, she was included in GameDailys list of top "hottest game babes" (ranked 42nd) and in UGOs list of top "videogame hotties" (ranked 46th). In 2011, Peter Rubin of Complex ranked the live-action version of Claire as 15th on the list of "hottest women in video game movies" and rated Ali Larter's likeness to the character at 56%. That same year, Rich Knight of Complex pitted the video game version of Claire against Jill Valentine in the feature "Battle of the Beauties", category "zombie killer", but chose Jill over her. Lisa Foiles of The Escapist ranked Claire as the third "cutest redhead" in video games

GameDaily featured her among the "chicks who will kick your ass" listed alongside Ada Wong, Jill and Sheva Alomar, and Jesse Schedeen of IGN chose her as one of the characters to recruit for an ultimate counter-zombie strike force. The book Level Up!: The Guide to Great Video Game Design called Claire a "perfect example" of the theme "opposites attracts", as she and her fellow Raccoon City survivor Sherry (a little girl dressed in a Japanese school uniform in RE2) "couldn't be more different." Featuring her in their 2009 list of top nine greatest video game heroines of all time, Peter Hartlaub of the San Francisco Chronicle chose Claire as an example of a positive female game character that "Brandi Chastain would be proud of." In 2015, The Guardian'''s Holly Nielsen listed Claire among the attractive female characters who in her opinion "were intelligently written and who were not overtly sexy" and Gita Jackson of Paste wrote an article about Claire Redfield's wardrobe, which "shows us that femininity, emotionality and practicality aren't exclusive from each other." Official PlayStation Magazine (UK) retrospective on RE2 opined Claire and Leon both "demonstrat[ed] the absolute apex of apocalyptic fashion."IGN included Claire among the characters they would like to see returning for Resident Evil 6, with Schedeen calling Claire "leagues above that walking bag of useless called Sheva." PSU too chose Claire (in her original outfit from Resident Evil 2) as one of the five characters they wanted to appear in Resident Evil 6s Mercenaries mode as she "is long overdue a canonical appearance in the series." In 2012, RE6 producer Hiroyuki Kobayashi wrote they have "heard a lot of love for Jill and Claire recently and people asking if they'll be in the next Resident Evil." Including Claire among the 30 best characters in the three decades of Capcom's history, GamesRadar staff commented in 2013: "Sadly she's fallen into the background of the series, which makes sense she avoided work as a government zombie hunter, but we hope Capcom has plans for her in the future. Here's a suggestion: a co-op focused RE that teams Claire up with the almost as underused Jill. It's your move Capcom." Reacting to Claire's return in Revelations 2 IGNs Mitch Dyer wrote: "The Resident Evil series places women in prominent, powerful, playable roles. Jill Valentine, Rebecca Chambers, Sheva Alomar, and Ada Wong, to name a few. Still, they're often opposite a male lead. This is the first time a Resident Evil game has revolved around the story of two women. It's fun to get to play as Claire again." According to a Computer and Video Games preview of Revelations 2, "she's older, calmer and more capable, but she still retains everything that made her compelling in the first place. Where Rachael from the first Revelations was part centrefold, part melted-ice cream, Claire feels distinct from many women in the Resi universe in that there's more to her than lady-lumps and lycra. She's the perfect choice for the game's brand of isolated horror." In January 2019, Brittany Vincent of SyFy claimed that Claire is "another good-looking video game heroine." She also described that "Claire is a strong-willed young woman who's tough as nails and ready to take on any challenge." In 2021, Alice Bell of Rock Paper Shotgun complimented Claire and said that she "has lovely hair" in Resident Evil: Welcome to Raccoon City.

Claire also received some negative reactions from reviewers. In Tropes vs. Women in Video Games, feminist media critic Anita Sarkeesian criticized Claire's alternate costumes as too revealing, particularly the motorsport umbrella costume. Meanwhile, Ravi Sinha of GamingBolt considered the character's design at the remake of Resident Evil 2 among the worst in video games, noting that the developers should have kept her original design.  One of the essays in Nadine Farghaly's Unraveling Resident Evil'' also criticized and compared Claire to a "typical trope" of "a virgin or tomboy".

Further reading

References

Action film characters
Capcom protagonists
Characters in American novels of the 20th century
Female characters in video games
Fictional American people in video games
Fictional female martial artists
Fictional gunfighters in video games
Fictional human rights activists
Fictional prison escapees
Fictional zombie hunters
Female horror film characters
Fictional martial artists in video games
Resident Evil characters
Science fiction film characters
Video game characters introduced in 1998
Vigilante characters in video games